The 2010 Liga Indonesia First Division is the 16th edition of Liga Indonesia First Division which is scheduled to start in September 2010 and finish in the same year.

Participating clubs will be divided 12 groups based on their regions in Java, Kalimantan, Sulawesi, Sumatera and Papua.

First stage
Total 57 clubs will participate in this season, divided into 12 groups.

Group Winner and runner-up qualify for 2nd round.

Group I: Unri Stadium, Riau

Group II: Kampung Rempak Stadium, Siak

Group III: Seribu Bukit Stadium, Blangkejeren, Gayo Lues Regency

Group IV: Kraton Stadium, Pekalongan

Group V: Supriyadi Stadium, Blitar

Group VI: Notohadinegoro Stadium, Jember

Group VII: Wilis Stadium, Madiun

Group VIII: Field 17 Sports Venues, Mataram

Group IX: Diponegoro Stadium, Banyuwangi

Group X: Kuonoto Stadium, Buol

Group XI: Andi Bintang Stadium, Sinjai

Group XII: Cenderawasih Stadium, Biak Numfor Regency

Second stage
This stage, which will start on October 28, 2010, involves 12 group winners and 12 runners up qualified from the first stage. Therefore, in total 24 clubs, which are divided into 6 groups will participate in this stage.

Qualified clubs for the 2nd round: Persas Sabang, Madina Medan Jaya, Siak FC, PSP Padang, PSBL Langsa, PSGL Gayo Luwes, Persip Pekalongan City, Persitema Temanggung, PSBK Blitar, Pesik Kuningan, Persid Jember, Persik Kendal, Madiun Putra FC, Persepam Pamekasan, KSB West Sumbawa, Persebi Bima Regency, Persewangi Banyuwangi, Persewon Wondama, Persbul Buol, Persipal Palu, Persin Sinjai, Persepar Palangkaraya, PSBS Biak, Mountain Star FC.

Group A (in Gayo Lues Regency, Nanggroe Aceh Darussalam)

Group B (in Temanggung Regency, Central Java)

Group C (in Madiun, East Java)

Group D (in Banyuwangi, East Java)

Group E (in Sinjai, Sinjai Regency, South Sulawesi)

Group F (in Biak Numfor Regency, Papua)

Third stage
Participants are the 6 group winners and 6 runners-up from second stage. Total 12 clubs will participate in this stage, divided into 3 groups. This stage will start on December 2 to December 8, 2010.

Qualified clubs for the 3rd round : PSGL Gayo Luwes, PSBL Langsa, PS Biak, Persbul Buol, Persitema Temanggung, Persip Pekalongan City, Madiun Putra FC, PSBK Blitar, Persewangi Banyuwangi, Persepam Pamekasan, Persin Sinjai and KSB West Sumbawa.

 Group I : Singaperbangsa Stadium, Karawang

 Group II : Singaperbangsa Stadium, Karawang

 Group III : Lebak Bulus Stadium, Jakarta

Fourth stage

Participate is 3 grub winner and 1 best runner-up from third stage. Total 4 clubs will participate in this stage.

Qualify teams
Persbul Buol
PSBS Biak
PSBL Langsa
Persepam Pamekasan

Knockout Phase

Semifinal

This stage schedule held on 10 December 2010.

Final stage

Participate is 2 Semifinal winner. Schedule held on 12 December 2010

References

Liga Indonesia First Division seasons
3